Return to Frogtown (also known as Frogtown II) is a 1993 B movie directed by Donald G. Jackson. It is the sequel to the 1988 cult film Hell Comes to Frogtown. Like its predecessor, the film is set in a post-apocalyptic future where mutant frog-people are at war with mankind.

Plot

Set some years after the events of the first movie,  Captain Delano (Charles Napier) sends Sam Hell to infiltrate Frog Town again to rescue Texas Rocket Ranger John Jones (played by Lou Ferrigno) who crash landed. In what may be a direct reference to his Incredible Hulk fame, Jones is an unwilling test subject who is modified and turned into a frog-person, giving him superhuman strength. The tests are conducted by Professor Tanzer (Brion James)  and Nurse Cloris (Linda Singer

This is part of a larger plot by the Evil Star Frogmeister to turn all humans into frogmen. Hell must journey to the Frogtown Mutant Reservation in a desperate attempt to stop the planned mutation

Cast
 Robert Z'Dar as Sam Hell
 Denice Duff as Dr. Spangle
 Kelsey as Commander Toty
 Michael Nyman as Frog
 Linda Singer as Nurse Cloris
 Lou Ferrigno as Ranger John Jones
 Don Stroud as Brandy Stone
 Brion James as Professor Tanzer
 Charles Napier as Captain Delano
 Rhonda Shear as Fuzzy
 Ken Davitian as Bud
 Brad Baker as Frog Guard

Production

Robert Z'Dar plays the main character, Sam Hell, in place of Roddy Piper. Notable co-stars of the cast include: Don Stroud, Brion James, Charles Napier, Rhonda Shear. The movie was followed by Max Hell Frog Warrior. Filmmaker Jackson claimed New World Pictures interfered with the picture.

Reception

Received two out of five stars in Creature Feature. TV Guide gave the movie one star out of five, greatly preferring the original film.

References

External links 
 
 
 

1993 films
1990s science fiction action films
American science fiction action films
American sequel films
American post-apocalyptic films
Films set in Texas
1990s English-language films
Films directed by Donald G. Jackson
1990s American films